Aranda is the debut studio album by the hard rock band Aranda. It was released in 2008 on Astonish Entertainment.

Track listing

Singles

References

External links
Aranda on Myspace
arandaVEVO on YouTube

2008 debut albums
Aranda (band) albums